Jean Colin may refer to:
Jean Colin (1905–1989), English actress
Jean Colin (general) (1864–1917), French soldier and military historian
Jean Baptiste Leopold Colin (1881–1961), Flemish painter
Vladimir Colin, pen name of Jean Colin (1921–1991), Romanian short story writer and novelist